KYEN may refer to:

 KYEN-LP, a defunct low-power radio station (95.9 FM) formerly licensed to serve Ennis, Texas, United States
 KRKA (FM), a radio station (103.9 FM) licensed to serve Severance, Colorado, United States, which held the call sign KYEN from 2007 to 2013